Zulm Ka Badla is a 1985 Hindi Bollywood crime action film, directed by K. Prasad and produced by Swaran Singh Kanwar. The film was released in 1985 under the banner of Swarn Films.

Cast
 Rakesh Roshan as Inspector Anil Verma
 Anita Raj as Geeta Verma / Mrs. D'Sa
 Danny Denzongpa as Bunty / Shambhu
 Shakti Kapoor as Jagdish Kumar "J.K." / Sangram Singh (Double Role) 
 Jagdish Raj as Inspector / DIG Verma
 Chandrashekhar as Colonel Rajesh
 Dinesh Hingoo
 Manik Irani
 Jagdeep
 Rajan Haksar as Pinto

Soundtrack

References

External links
 

1985 films
1980s Hindi-language films
Indian action films
Indian films about revenge
1985 action films
Hindi-language action films